Horní Vltavice is a municipality and village in Prachatice District in the South Bohemian Region of the Czech Republic. It has about 300 inhabitants.

Administrative parts
The village of Račí and areas of extinct villages of Březová Lada, Polka, Slatina and Žlíbky are administrative parts of Horní Vltavice.

References

Villages in Prachatice District
Bohemian Forest